Joseph Vuna (born 31 July 1998) is a professional rugby league footballer who plays as a  forward for the Gold Coast Titans in the NRL.

He previously played for the New Zealand Warriors in the National Rugby League.

Background
Vuna was born in Alameda County, California, United States and grew up in New Zealand. He is the younger brother of dual-code rugby international Cooper Vuna.

Career

2018
Vuna made his NRL debut for the New Zealand Warriors in their annual ANZAC Day match against the Melbourne Storm.

He left the club at the end of the 2018 season to go on a Mormon mission.

2021
Vuna began the 2021 season playing for the Tweed Heads Seagulls in the Queensland Cup, and returned to the NRL for the Gold Coast Titans in round 13 against the Melbourne Storm.

References

External links
Gold Coast Titans profile
Tweed Seagulls profile
Warriors profile

1998 births
Living people
American rugby league players
American people of New Zealand descent
American people of Tongan descent
New Zealand Warriors players
Gold Coast Titans players
Rugby league second-rows